Northfield Township is a civil township of Washtenaw County in the U.S. state of Michigan.  The population was 8,514 at the 2020 census.

Communities
Emery was settled as early as 1831 by Joshua Leland from Madison County, New York. He named the settlement after his son Emery Leland, who much later served as Northfield Township Supervisor and county judge. Emery was renamed Leland in 1884 when the Toledo, Ann Arbor & Northern Michigan Railroad built a station named Leland in the community. Despite the name change, a post office opened in the community under the name Emery on February 20, 1884 and operated until March 31, 1903.
 Gravel Run is a former settlement that was founded by Roswell Curtis in 1842, and he became the first postmaster when the Gravel Run post office opened on May 18, 1850.  He served in this capacity until he died in 1870.  The community was named after the stream where the community was located.  The post office was transferred to and renamed Northfield on October 2, 1860.  The Gravel Run post office was soon reestablished on October 22, 1860.  The post office closed on November 19, 1875 but was restored briefly from November 12, 1877 until it ultimately closed on July 19, 1878.   
A post office was first established here on June 9, 1834 and was named after the township. The post office was transferred to and renamed Whitmore Lake on December 17, 1854. The Northfield post office was reestablished on February 16, 1855 and operated until January 3, 1856.
 Walsh is the name of a former settlement within the township.  The Walsh post office was established on July 18, 1881 after it was transferred from Webster in neighboring Webster Township.  Webster reestablished its own post office on April 14, 1882.  The Walsh post office operated until January 13, 1885.
The CDP also extends north into Green Oak Township in Livingston County.

Geography

Major highways
 runs south–north through the western portion of the township.

Demographics
As of the census of 2020, there were 8,514 people, 3,521 households, and 2,236 families residing in the township. The racial makeup of the township was 97.3% White, 0.6% African American, 0.0% Native American, 0.7% Asian, 0.0% Pacific Islander, 0.23% from other races, and 1.2% from two or more races. Hispanic or Latino of any race were 3.6% of the population.

There were 3,521 households, out of which 20.9% had children under the age of 18 living with them, 58.1% were married couples living together, 8.8% had a female householder with no husband present, and 29.1% were non-families. 21.5% of all households were made up of individuals, and 13.7% had someone living alone who was 65 years of age or older.  The average household size was 2.41 and the average family size was 3.02.

In the township, 26.9% of the population was under the age of 18, 7.1% were from 18 to 24, 36.8% from 25 to 44, 22.2% from 45 to 64, and 13.7% were 65 years of age or older.  The median age was 35 years. For every 100 females, there were 102.8 males.  For every 100 females age 18 and over, there were 98.2 males.

The median income for a household in the township was $79,890, and the median income for a family was $68,393. Males had a median income of $41,883 versus $30,680 for females. The per capita income for the township was $40,621.  About 2.4% of families and 4.1% of the population were below the poverty line, including 3.9% of those under age 18 and 0.9% of those age 65 or over.

Education
Northfield Township is served by four separate public school districts.  Ann Arbor Public Schools serves small portions of the southern area of the township.  Whitmore Lake Public Schools serves most of the southeast to northwest areas of the township, and South Lyon Community Schools in South Lyon serves the northeast portion.  Very small portions of the northwestern edge of the township are served by Dexter Community School District to the southwest in Dexter.

Notable people
 Martha Waldron Janes (1832–?), minister, suffragist, columnist

Images

References

Sources

External links

Northfield Township office website

Townships in Washtenaw County, Michigan
1832 establishments in Michigan Territory
Populated places established in 1832
Townships in Michigan